The Campeonato Goiano is the football league of the state of Goiás, Brazil.

Format

First Division

First stage 
Teams are divided in two groups of six teams.
Double round-robin, in which all teams home-and-away games against the team from other group.
Standard round-robin, in which all teams play each other once within the group.

Second stage 
Home-and-away playoffs with the top 2 teams of each group. 

The winner of the second stage is crowned the champion.

The two teams last placed overall in the first stage are relegated to the second division.

As in any other Brazilian soccer championship, the format can change every year.

Clubs

First Division

List of champions

Titles by team

Teams in bold still active.

By city

External links

FGF Official Website
RSSSF

Goianão
Goiano